Starmax is a South Korean DVD distributor specifically for the Korean market; their films are often encoded for Region 3 and the extras typically do not feature English-language subtitles.  Variety called them "one of the biggest video distribution companies in [South Korea]."  They were spun off of Samsung in 1984, and they were purchased by The Omega Group, a Japanese company, in 1999.  They announced a merger with Gaonix in 2002.

References 

Entertainment companies of South Korea